Nila Nila Odi Vaa is a 2018 Indian Tamil-language horror romantic comedy web television series hosted on Viu, a video on demand digital distribution platform. It is directed by Nandhini JS and produced by Viu and Make Believe Productions. This is Nandhini's first web series as a director, who made her debut directorial venture with Thiru Thiru Thuru Thuru (2009). The web series was released on 24 July 2018 and concluded up on 5 October 2018 with 13 episodes; the first season ended on a cliffhanger, leaving the chance for more sequential seasons open. It stars Sunaina in her web series debut and Ashwin Kakumanu of Mankatha fame, with Anupama Kumar, Aswath Chandrasekhar, Srikrishna Dayal, Hariish, Praveen Kumar and Abhishek Vinod in supporting roles.

Cast 

 Ashwin Kakumanu as Om (Om Prakash): a human turned vampire
 Sunaina as Nila, a vampire turned human
 Anupama Kumar as Devi
 Misha Ghoshal as Meera
 Srikrishna Dayal as Jamaal
 Abhishek Vinod as Alex
 Aswath Chandrasekhar as Thomas
 Gabriella Sellus as Poonkodi
 Shira Gaarg as Patricia
 Vignesh Vijayan as Suresh
 Praveen Kumar as Vikram
 Hariish CK as Anand
 Bavithra as Yamuna
 Vino Lordson
 Ravi Venkatraman

Plot 
Om a tattoo artist in order to expand his career purchases a studio on the outskirts of Chennai. He meets up with his college crush Nila, a vampire who tries attack him and stops after she recognises him love blossoms between them both and Nila reveals how she was turned into a vampire by Alex who wants to turns the human dominant civilisation into a vampire dominant one. A group of people called slayers are trying to demolish these vampires since they are considered as blood sucking animals. One day Nila introduces Om to her best friend Meera (125 year old vampire) who rejects her relationship with Om since he is a human, on the same night Alex catches Nila red handed with Om they are both assaulted by Alex and the rest of the group until they are rescued by slayers who burns Alex and his group by a new weapon. Om takes a promise from Nila not to turn him into a vampire in turn he promises her to turn her back to human. After many trials he arrives at the doorstep of Devi(sorceress), whose blood can turn vampires back to human and she herself becomes vampire and turns back normal after reading certain scriptures. Devi refuses to accept Om's pleas since  she feels herself losing her control after her last encounter with a vampire in which she loses control and kills her own disciples. A completely shattered Om is blackmailed by a goon who tries to kidnap his assistant Poonkodi suddenly Nila emerges from no where and kills the goon. Om loses his temper and asks Nila to not be like a monster and get lost from his life. Next day inspector Jamal, a slayer investigates the case and finds out Nila to be a vampire. Nila hides in Meera's home and stops drinking blood because of Om's accusations. Om becomes more concerned about Nila and goes to rescue her when Meera was caught by the slayers. He confesses to Nila that he was afraid to lose her and is deeply in love with her, suddenly the slayers attack them and Nila hypnotised one of the slayers to sleep while the other was hurt by Om. Nila becomes very weak because of her blood strike Om offers his blood but she refuses it because of her promise. Om takes Nila to Devi. Devi changes her mind and decides to help Nila while preparing for the arrangements. Inspector Jamal attacks them from outside the home. Devi asks Nila if she had hypnotised Om into loving her Nila reveals that none of the vampires are able to hypnotise Om. Jamal shoots an arrow which strikes Om. Devi informs to almost dying Om that he is just like her and his blood can turn Nila back human upon hearing this he asks Nila to suck his blood and she obeys. Jamal breaks into Devi's house and is shocked to see Nila who is now a human. The series ends by revealing that Om has become a ferocious vampire.

Production 
This was the first Tamil web series developed by Viu network with the intention of developing at least 100 more web series within a space of 3 years. Viu Tamil network roped in Nandhini JS as the director for the series titled Nila Nila Odi Vaa. It was also revealed that popular film cinematographer Vijay Armstrong used practical lights instead of the traditional film set lighting.

References

External links 

 

Tamil-language web series
2018 Tamil-language television series debuts
Tamil-language romantic comedy television series
Tamil-language fantasy television series
2018 Tamil-language television series endings
Viu (streaming media) original programming